This is a list of Eritrean Orthodox monasteries:

 Debre Bizen
 Debre Dehuhan
 Debre Libanos
 Debre Mariam
 Debre Merqorewos
 Debre Sina
 Debre Tsige (Abune Yonas)
 Debre Tsaeda Emba Selassi
 Debre Mawan 
 Debre Kol (Enda Abune Buruk)
 Debre Tilul 
 Gedam kudus Yohans( Tedrer)
 Gedam Abune Andrias (Liban)
 Debre Kudadu (Endabuxuamlak)
 Gedam Abune Ambes

Orthodox monasteries
 
Monasteries